
This is a list of bridges documented by the Historic American Engineering Record in the US state of Oregon.

Bridges

See also
List of tunnels documented by the Historic American Engineering Record in Oregon

Notes

References

List
List
Oregon
Bridges, HAER
Bridges, HAER